The Forest Fire (c. 1505) is a painting by Italian Renaissance painter Piero di Cosimo. The painting depicts a variety of frightened animals attempting to escape a forest fire. The painting has a lot of activity, at the center of which is the raging fire itself. One of the earliest landscape paintings of the Renaissance, it combines real animals as well as made up animals. It was inspired by Book 5 of Lucretius's On the Nature of Things.

Further reading
The Forest Fire by Piero Cosimo

References

1505 paintings
Paintings by Piero di Cosimo
Lions in art
Birds in art
Cattle in art
Paintings in the collection of the Ashmolean Museum